Kurt Hansen (1 February 1928 – 21 February 2018) was a Danish footballer. He played in three matches for the Denmark national football team from 1953 to 1954.

References

External links
 

1928 births
2018 deaths
Danish men's footballers
Denmark international footballers
Place of birth missing
Association footballers not categorized by position